Vittorio Cavalleri or Cavalieri (16 February 1860 – 1938) was an Italian painter. He mainly painted outdoor genre scenes.

Cavalleri was born in Turin. In 1878, he enrolled in the Accademia Albertina, where he studied under Enrico Gamba, Andrea Gastaldi, and Pier Celestino Gilardi. In 1884, he exhibited in the Esposizione Generale of Turin. In 1885, he exhibited the work Le zappe abbandonate at the Promotrice. He tended to paint refined genre pieces.

He was influenced by Divisionism and the style of Telemaco Signorini. He studied and later taught at the Accademia Albertina. He painted with Anselmo Sacerdote, Giovanni Colmo, and Carlo Pollonera in the so-called School of Rivara.

Among his pupils was Mario Gachet.

References

1860 births
1938 deaths
Painters from Turin
19th-century Italian painters
Italian male painters
20th-century Italian painters
Accademia Albertina alumni
Academic staff of Accademia Albertina
19th-century Italian male artists
20th-century Italian male artists